Savage Drums is a 1951 American adventure film directed by William Berke and starring Sabu, Lita Baron, H.B. Warner. The film was released by the independent producer Robert L. Lippert. Although Lippert had previously announced his films would be first features, this was one of a number of B Movies he produced during the period. The Indian-born actor Sabu had previously enjoyed fame as the star of several films produced by Alexander Korda.

Plot

Cast
 Sabu as Tipo Tairu
 Lita Baron as Sari
 H.B. Warner as Maou
 Sid Melton as Jimmy Cuso
 Steven Geray as Borodoff
 Robert Easton as Tex Channing 
 Margia Dean as Tania
 Francis Pierlot as Aruna
 Paul Marion as Rata Tairu
 Ray Kinney as Rami
 John Mansfield as Tuana 'John' Tairu
 Edward Clark as Tabuana, older chief on council
 Hugh Beaumont as Bill Fenton

References

Bibliography
 Davis, Blair. The Battle for the Bs: 1950s Hollywood and the Rebirth of Low-Budget Cinema. Rutgers University Press, 2012.

External links

1951 films
American adventure drama films
1950s English-language films
Films directed by William A. Berke
Lippert Pictures films
1950s adventure drama films
American black-and-white films
1950s American films